Els Ports may refer to any of the following:
Ports (comarca)
Ports de Tortosa-Beseit
Ports de Morella

See also
Ports (disambiguation)